Amata Municipality is a former municipality in Vidzeme, Latvia. The municipality was formed in 2000 by merging Amata parish and Drabeši parish, but in 2009 it absorbed Nītaure parish, Skujene parish and Zaube parish, too. The administrative centre is located in the "Ausmas" homestead near Drabeši.

On 1 July 2021, Amata Municipality ceased to exist and its territory was merged into Cēsis Municipality, reverting back to the pre-2009 parishes.

Twin towns — sister cities

Amata was twinned with:
 Alytus, Lithuania

See also
Administrative divisions of Latvia

References

 
Former municipalities of Latvia